Tubagere, is a  Town and Grama Panchayat in Bangalore Rural district in the state of Karnataka, India. Tubagere in the native Kannada. Population of 2,199. This is a major agricultural hub near Doddaballapur. It is seen as a model town Center's Rural Bio-Resources Complex Project. Many farming families in 51 villages of Tubagere Hobli in Doddaballpur taluk have been benefited by the Bio-Resources Complex Project that has been launched on a pilot basis in Tubagere Hobli by the National Bio-Resources Development Board of the Union Government. The aim of the project is to increase the income of farmers by four times in five years starting from 1 April 2005, through reduction of the cost of cultivation and crop diversification. They hope it will put an end to the trend of farmers’ suicides and also the mass desertion of agriculture by farmers.

Government offices 
 Grama Panchayat office, Tubagere Grama Panchayat
 Assistant Engineer (Panchayat Raj) office, Tubagere Hobali
 Assistant Engineer(BESCOM)office, Tubagere Section 
 Raitha Samparka Kendra(Agriculture), Tubagere Hobali
 Upa-Tahsildar (Revenue)office, Tubagere Hobali
 Registrar (Birth & Death) Office, Tubagere Circle 
 Government Veterinary Hospital, Tubagere
 Pri-Metric Hostel, Tubagere
 Junior Engineer (BSNL)office, Tubagere
 Primary Health Center, Tubagere
 Post Office, Tubagere(561204)

School and colleges 
 Government High School, Tubagere 
 Government PU College,Tubagere

Bank 
 Corporation Bank, Tubagere

Tourist places 
 Makali Durga Hills : Sri Subramanya Ghati
 Sri Raghavendra Swamy Matha:  Lakkasandra.
 Prasanna Lakshmi Venkateshwara Swamy Temple : Tubagere
 Sri Ghati Subramanya Swamy Temple : Ghati Subramanya

References

Cities and towns in Bangalore Rural district
Doddaballapura Taluk